László Gergely or Geiger (20 January 1916 – 10 March 1946) was a Hungarian ice hockey player. He played for the Hungarian national team at the 1936 Winter Olympics and at several World Championships. His brother, András Gergely, was also an ice hockey player, and played with László at the Olympics.

References

External links
 
 
 

1916 births
1946 deaths
Ferencvárosi TC (ice hockey) players
Hungarian ice hockey right wingers
Ice hockey players at the 1936 Winter Olympics
Olympic ice hockey players of Hungary
Ice hockey people from Budapest
Deaths from cholangiocarcinoma
Deaths from cancer in Hungary